Highway 353 (AR 353, Ark. 353, and Hwy. 353) is a north–south state highway in Hempstead County, Arkansas. The highway serves as a connector between US Highway 67 and the community of Guernsey across Interstate 30 (I-30). The highway is maintained by the Arkansas State Highway and Transportation Department (AHTD).

Route description
The highway begins at US 67 west of Hope in the Arkansas Timberlands. Highway 353 runs northwest along an overpass over I-30 to a crossroads at Guernsey, where it terminates. The highway does not provide access to I-30.

The southern terminus of Highway 353 is a former AHTD weigh station.

History
The highway was created by the Arkansas State Highway Commission on November 23, 1966. The routing not changed since creation.

Major intersections

See also

References

External links

353
Transportation in Hempstead County, Arkansas